The Turkish Women's Volleyball Championship (Turkish: Türkiye Kadınlar Voleybol  Şampiyonası) is a defunct volleyball league competition in Turkish volleyball, run by the Turkish Volleyball Federation from 1956 to 1983.

Champions

All champions

References
 Vala Somalı, "Türk-Dünya Voleybol Tarihi: 1895-1986", İstanbul (1986).
 Rüştü Dağlaroğlu, "Fenerbahçe Spor Kulübü Tarihi 1907-1987", İstanbul (1988).
 Cem Atabeyoğlu, "Türk Spor Tarihi Ansiklopedisi", İstanbul (1991).

Womens Championship
Turkey
1956 establishments in Turkey
1983 disestablishments in Turkey
Women's volleyball leagues
Volleyball
Defunct sports leagues in Turkey
Sports leagues established in 1956